This is a list of newspapers in East Timor.

The Dili Weekly
Jornal Nacional Diário
Suara Timor Lorosae
Travel Media Timor
Timor Post

See also
List of newspapers

References

East Timor
Newspapers